= Shrinivas Khandewale =

Indian economist

Dr. Shrinivas Khandewale is an Indian Agro-economist. He is an activist for separate statehood of Vidarbha. He authored several studies on agriculture in Vidarbha region.
